Terry Bates may refer to:
Terry Bates (American Dad!), a character from American Dad!
Terry Bates (EastEnders), a character from EastEnders